Robert Underwood Ayres (born June 29, 1932) is an American-born physicist and economist. His career has focused on the application of physical ideas, especially the laws of thermodynamics, to economics; a long-standing pioneering interest in material flows and transformations (industrial ecology or industrial metabolism)—a concept which he originated. His most recent work challenges the widely held economic theory of growth.

Career
Trained as a physicist at the University of Chicago, University of Maryland, and King's College London (PhD in Mathematical Physics), Ayres has dedicated his professional life to advancing the environment, technology and resource end of the sustainability agenda. His major research interests include technological change, environmental economics, "industrial metabolism" and "eco-restructuring". He has worked at the Hudson Institute (1962–67), Resources for the Future Inc (1968) and International Research and Technology Corp (1969–76). From 1979 until 1992 he was Professor of Engineering and Public Policy at Carnegie Mellon University, Pittsburgh, Pennsylvania, except for two years (and six summers) on leave at the International Institute for Applied Systems Analysis (IIASA) in Laxenburg Austria. In 1992 he moved to the international business school INSEAD in Fontainebleau, France as Sandoz (later Novartis) Professor of Environment and Management. Since his formal retirement in 2000 he has been Jubilee Visiting Professor (2000–2001) and king Karl Gustav XVI professor of environmental science (2004–2005) at Chalmers Institute of Technology Gothenburg (Sweden). He is currently an Institute Scholar at IIASA.

He remains an active researcher. He has written or co-authored 20 books, edited or coedited another dozen books, written or co-authored more than 200 journal articles and book chapters not to mention many unpublished reports, on subjects ranging from environmental effects of nuclear war to theoretical economics. But most of his life-work is interdisciplinary. He was a pioneer of a new field, sometimes called Industrial Metabolism or Industrial Ecology. He has contributed to futures studies, technological forecasting, transportation and energy studies, material flow studies (`dematerialization'), environmental technology, environmental economics, thermodynamics and economics, and the theory of economic growth.

Here taken from one of his recent papers are two paragraphs that provide a flavor of his recent work:

Mainstream economics today is based to a large extent on bad ideas. Economic concepts, from foundational issues like markets, supply and demand and “free trade”,  to money and finance, lack any systematic awareness of the physical process of production or the implications of the Laws of Thermodynamics  for those processes. A corollary, almost worthy of being a separate bad idea on its own, is that energy doesn’t matter (much) because the cost share of energy in the economy is so small that it can be ignored e.g. {Denison, 1984 #6184}. The so-called “production functions” used by all schools of economic thought that build growth models omit any necessary role for energy, as if output could be produced by labor and capital alone—or as if energy is merely a form of man-made capital that can be produced (as opposed to extracted) by labor and capital.

The essential truth missing from economic education today is that energy is the stuff of the universe, that all matter is also a form of energy, and that the economic system is essentially a system for extracting, processing and transforming energy as resources into energy embodied in products and services. This is a thermodynamic process, as the Rumanian economist Georgescu-Roegen said half a century ago (Georgescu-Roegen 1971). The economic process is subject to both the first law of thermodynamics (conservation of mass/energy; nothing can be created or destroyed) and the second law of thermodynamics (increasing entropy; all transformation processes are irreversible). The “first law” implies that the notion of “consumption” as applied to products is misleading: material transformation processes unavoidably generate large quantities of material wastes or residuals {Ayres, 1969 #284;{Ayres, 1989 #424}.  Some of those wastes are merely inconvenient but others are harmful or toxic. The second law says that energy becomes less useful (exergy is destroyed) by every action.

There is much more to be said along these lines. Key publications reflecting these (and some other) important ideas are given in the bibliography below.

Publications

 Paperback 

 Paperback 
 

 Alternative ISBNs: (1) Hardcover  (2) e-book 

 Alternative

References

External links
Profile at EcoPlan International
Profile at INSEAD
Curriculum Vitae at Energy Science Center from Fall Semester 2009 presentation.

Alumni of King's College London
Living people
Ecological economists
Environmental economists
Academic staff of INSEAD
1932 births
University of Chicago alumni
Carnegie Mellon University faculty
American expatriates in the United Kingdom